Chapin is a surname. Notable people with the surname include:

Alaric B. Chapin (1848–1924), Union hero in American Civil War
Alfred C. Chapin (1848–1936), US politician
Alice Chapin, (1857–1934), militant suffragette and silent film actress
Amzi Chapin (1768–1835), US cabinetmaker, singing-school teacher and shapenote composer
Andy Chapin (1951–1985), US musician
Anna Alice Chapin (1880–1920), US author
Arthur Chapin (1868–1943), US politician
Augusta Jane Chapin (1836–1905), US religious figure and women's rights activist
Billy Chapin (1943–2016), US actor
Charles Chapin (1858–1930), US newspaper editor, convicted murderer ("The Rose Man")
Charles V. Chapin (1856–1941), US physician and activist in public health
Chester W. Chapin (1798–1883), US politician
Clifford Chapin (born 1988), US voice actor working for Funimation
Cornelia Van Auken Chapin (1893–1972), US sculptor
Darrin Chapin (born 1966), US baseball player
Dwight Chapin (born 1940), US politician
Edward Payson Chapin (1831–1863), Union Officer in the American Civil War
Edwin Hubbell Chapin (1814–1880), US preacher and religious writer
Edwin N. Chapin (1823–1896), US postmaster and newspaper publisher
Eliphalet Chapin (1741–1807), US cabinetmaker
Esther Maria Lewis Chapin (1871–1959), US society figure
F. Stuart Chapin III (born 1944), US educator
Francis Chapin (1899–1965), US artist
F. Stuart Chapin (1888–1974), US educator and sociologist
Frederic L. Chapin (1929–1987), US diplomat
Frederick H. Chapin (1852–1900), US businessman, mountaineer, photographer, amateur geologist
Graham H. Chapin (1799–1843), US politician
Harold Chapin (1886–1915), British playwright
Harry Chapin (1942–1981), US musician
Henry Chapin (1811–1878), US politician and judge
Herman M. Chapin (1823–1879), US politician
James Ormsbee Chapin (1887–1975), US artist
James Chapin (1889–1964), US ornithologist
Jen Chapin (f. 2000s), US musician
Jim Chapin (1919–2009), US musician
John Putnam Chapin (1810–1864), US politician
John R. Chapin (f. 1800s), US artist and illustrator
Lauren Chapin (born 1945), US actress
Linda Chapin (f. 2000s), US politician
Mary W. Chapin (1820–1899), US educator and college president
Miles Chapin (born 1954), US actor
Nettie Sanford Chapin (1830–1901), US teacher, historian, author, newspaper publisher, suffragist
Ralph Chapin (1915–2000), US businessman
Roger Chapin (born 1933), US businessman and activist
Roy D. Chapin (1880–1936), US industrialist
Roy D. Chapin Jr. (1915–2001), US industrialist
Samuel Chapin (1598–1675), US founder of Springfield, Massachusetts
Sandra Chapin (born 1932), US personality, wife of Harry Chapin
Schuyler Chapin (1923–2009), US opera director
Selden Chapin (1899–1963), US diplomat
Steve Chapin, (born c. 1944), US musician
Thomas Chapin (1957–1998), US musician
Tom Chapin (born 1945), US musician